Sun City Township is a township in Barber County, Kansas, USA.  As of the 2000 census, its population was 100.

Geography
According to the USGS, it contains one cemetery, Sunnyside.

The streams of Bear Creek, Elk Creek, Mulberry Creek, North Elk Creek, South Elk Creek and Turkey Creek run through this township.

References
 USGS Geographic Names Information System (GNIS)

External links
 US-Counties.com
 City-Data.com

Townships in Barber County, Kansas
Townships in Kansas